Ndhlovu is an African surname that may refer to:

Annastacia Ndhlovu, Zimbabwean politician
Kelvin Ndhlovu (born 1985), Zambian squash player
Lepono Ndhlovu (born 1986), Ugandan cricketer
Pardon Ndhlovu (born 1987), Zimbabwean marathon runner
Samuel Ndhlovu (1937–2001), Zambian football player and coach

Bantu-language surnames